Galesburg Township may refer to the following townships in the United States:

 Galesburg Township, Knox County, Illinois
 Galesburg Township, Kingman County, Kansas

See also 
 Galesburg City Township, Knox County, Illinois